Osamu Nakajima (Shinjitai: 中嶋 修, born 16 June 1958 – 21 October 2012 ) was a Japanese racing driver.

Complete JGTC/Super GT Results

References 

1958 births
2012 deaths
Japanese racing drivers
Racing drivers who died while racing
Super GT drivers
Formula Nippon drivers